Prakash Velip is an Indian politician and member of the Bharatiya Janata Party. Velip was a member of the Goa Legislative Assembly in 1984 from the Quepem Assembly constituency in South Goa district as a member of the Maharashtrawadi Gomantak Party .

References 

People from North Goa district
Bharatiya Janata Party politicians from Goa
Goa MLAs 1984–1989
Indian National Congress politicians from Goa
Maharashtrawadi Gomantak Party politicians
Living people
21st-century Indian politicians
Year of birth missing (living people)